Air Algérie Flight 5017 was a scheduled international passenger flight from Ouagadougou, Burkina Faso, to Algiers, Algeria, which crashed near Gossi, Mali, on 24 July 2014. The McDonnell Douglas MD-83 twinjet with 110 passengers and 6 crew on board, operated by Swiftair for Air Algérie, disappeared from radar about fifty minutes after take-off. There were no survivors.

The French Bureau of Enquiry and Analysis for Civil Aviation Safety (BEA), assisting the Malian authorities, published an investigation report in April 2016, concluding that, while the aircraft was cruising on autopilot, ice accretion on the engines caused a reduction of thrust that led to a high-altitude stall. The crew was unable to recover from the stall, and the aircraft crashed to the ground. The BEA issued several recommendations to Air Algérie, the US Federal Aviation Administration, and the Governments of Burkina Faso and Mali.

Accident

Flight 5017 departed from Ouagadougou Airport at 1:15 local time (UTC) on 24 July 2014. It was scheduled to land at Houari Boumediene Airport, Algiers, at 5:10 local time (4:10 UTC).

Afterwards, the aircraft entered a left-hand turn and began to lose altitude more rapidly, thus spiralling down.

On 28 July, it was revealed that the flight crew had asked to return to Burkina Faso, after first requesting to deviate from course because of bad weather. There was a mesoscale convective system in the area at the time, and the aircraft had deviated to the left of its course to avoid it. Satellite images apparently identifying the light flare from the aircraft impact at the margins of the storm were captured.

Initially there were conflicting reports of the location of the crash. The aircraft's flight route took it over Mali, and it was reported to have disappeared between Gao and Tessalit. French forces reported detecting wreckage of the aircraft in an area between Gao and Kidal, in a desert region that is difficult to access. France sent a military unit to secure the wreckage of the Air Algérie plane. Malian President Ibrahim Boubacar Keïta said wreckage had been found in the country's northern desert, between Aguelhok and Kidal. There were also reports of wreckage being found near the town of Tilemsi in Mali, with officials from Algeria, Burkina Faso, and France having issued conflicting details. A memorial stele was erected at the crash site.

Aircraft

The aircraft involved in the accident was a McDonnell Douglas MD-83, MSN 53190, line number 2148. It was powered by two Pratt & Whitney JT8D engines and first flew in June 1996 and was 18 years old at the time of the accident.

The aircraft was acquired by Swiftair, a charter flight operator, and re-registered EC-LTV in 2012 after being used by several airlines since it was delivered in 1996. It was wet-leased to Air Algérie in June 2014 to provide additional capacity during the summer 2014 season.

At the time of its loss, EC-LTV had flown 32,000 cycles. The director of the Directorate General for Civil Aviation (DGAC) of France, Patrick Gandil, said the plane had been checked in France "two or three days ago" and that it was "in good condition".

Passengers and crew

There were 110 passengers on the plane; of those, 52 were French citizens, at least 33 of whom were French military personnel serving in Africa including three senior intelligence officials. A senior Hezbollah leader who had been posing as a businessman in Senegal and Burkina Faso was also on board. Others came from Burkina Faso, Lebanon, Algeria, Spain, Canada, Germany and Luxembourg. An Air Algérie representative in Burkina Faso, Kara Terki, told a news conference that all passengers were in transit to Europe, the Middle East, or Canada. The number of persons holding multiple citizenship onboard was apparently high. The Lebanese embassy in Abidjan estimated the number of Lebanese citizens on the flight, some of whom had dual nationality, was at least 20. One Chilean had dual French nationality. There was initial uncertainty about the exact number of French citizens and number of passengers on board.

On 25 July, French President François Hollande stated that there were no survivors. All of the victims had been identified by 19 November, nearly 4 months after the accident.

The crew members of Flight 5017 were Captain Agustín Comerón Mogio, First Officer Isabel Gost Caimari, and four flight attendants; all six were Spanish.

Captain Mogio had accumulated a total flying experience of 12,988 flying hours, including 8,689 as a captain, in which 10,007 flying hours were on the type. From 1989 to 1994, he became a co-pilot on a McDonnell Douglas MD-80 with Centennial. From 1997 to 2012, he became a co-pilot, and subsequently promoted to a captain on an MD-80 in Spanair. He finally joined Swiftair as a captain on an MD-80. He also had served for the UN mission in Africa based in Khartoum, Sudan. He had flown an aircraft to various places in Africa including to Ouagadougou. From the start of his operations with Air Algerie on 20 June 2014, Captain Mogio had carried out 45 flights and 100 flying hours.

First Officer Isabel Gost Caimari had accumulated a total flying experience of 7,016 flying hours including 6,180 flying hours as a co-pilot on MD-80. Since 20 June 2014, date of the start of operations with Air Algerie, First Officer Gost had carried out 43 flights and 93 flying hours. From 1995 to 1998, she became a dispatcher at Spanair; From 1998 to 2012, as a co-pilot on an MD-80 in Spanair, and on 1 June 2013 she joined Swiftair S.A. as a co-pilot on an MD-80. Between 1998 and 2012, as a co-pilot with Spanair, she had flown to various aerodromes in Africa, including the one at Ouagadougou.

Aftermath

Search effort
The wreckage was found southeast of Gossi, Mali, and United Nations personnel moved to secure the crash site on 25 July.  French television showed images of the wreckage site taken by a soldier from Burkina Faso.  The brief footage showed a desolate area with scattered debris that was unrecognizable.  There were bits of twisted metal but no identifiable parts such as the fuselage or tail, or victims' bodies.  Scrubby vegetation could be seen scattered in the background.  A French Reaper drone based in Niger spotted the wreckage after getting alerts from Burkina Faso and Malian soldiers.  French soldiers were the first to reach the site.  Burkina Faso's prime minister, Luc Adolphe Tiao, reviewed videos of the wreckage site and said that identifying the victims would be challenging.

Reactions
Because most of those on board were French citizens, France declared three days of national mourning following the crash. Flags flew at half mast on every public building from 28 July for three days. Algeria also declared a three-day mourning period.

Burkina Faso also began two days of mourning over the crash which killed 28 Burkina Faso citizens. During the mourning period, flags in Burkina Faso flew at half mast while all public celebrations were cancelled. The Burkinabé Minister for National Security assured the families of victims that the government would do all it can to shed light on the circumstances leading to the crash.

During October 2014, Air Algerie officially retired flight numbers AH5016 and AH5017 to honor the lives of those lost in the crash. On 24 July 2015, one year after the crash, a vigil and memorial to the victims was held in Ouagadougou. Relatives of the crash laid flowers and candles at a cemetery, and it was stated that the remains of unidentified victims of the crash would be buried in Bamako, the capital of Mali.

Investigation
The Malian authorities opened an investigation, with the President of the Mali Commission of Inquiry as the director, and the French Bureau of Enquiry and Analysis for Civil Aviation Safety (BEA) provided technical assistance.

On 27 July, BEA investigators arrived at the crash site to collect evidence. Both black boxes were recovered, and data from the flight data recorder (FDR) was read out. The cockpit voice recorder (CVR) had been damaged in the impact and repaired, but "the recordings that [the magnetic tape] contains are unusable, due apparently to a recorder malfunction, with no link to the damage that resulted from the accident". As a result, the investigation prioritized alternative sources, like records of air-traffic transmissions.

On 7 August, the investigation team held a press conference at BEA's headquarters in Paris. They outlined the team structure (three international working groups assigned to the "aircraft", "systems" and "operations" each) and presented an abridged timeline and a reconstruction of the aircraft's flight path. An interim report was scheduled to be published mid-September. Following the conference, Gérard Feldzer, an aviation expert, told BFMTV that the aircraft trajectory recorded by the FDR strongly suggested the plane had stalled in bad weather.

On 20 September, the BEA released an interim report into the crash.  The report contained data extracted from the FDR, as well as an explanation why the CVR is mostly unusable: the CVR did record the cockpit noises and conversations on the magnetic tape, but without erasing the existing content first, so that the record is a mix of numerous hours of recording on a 32-minute tape. Parts of the radio exchanges with ATC could be made out, but it is not known whether the remainder of the cockpit conversations, for which no external recording exists, will be able to be determined.

The EPR is the main parameter for engine power management, and is derived from pressure sensors at the engine inlets. The sensors had probably become clogged with ice in this case. Such icing is normally prevented by a hot-air system, which probably was not activated by the aircrew during climb and cruise, according to BEA "analysis of the available data". The faulty EPR values caused the engine controllers to limit the thrust to much less than required to maintain sufficient airspeed for stability at the altitude that the autopilot tried to maintain by increasing the angle of attack until stall occurred. Twenty seconds after the initial stall, the plane suddenly rolled sharply left to almost full inversion as the autopilot disengaged, and pitched nose down to near vertical. The BEA notes that "the recorded parameters indicate that there were no stall recovery manoeuvres by the crew", while the flight control surface deflections remained those that would normally intend nose-up and right-roll. The BEA noted two previous similar incidents involving MD-82 and MD-83 aircraft, where the aircrews were alert enough to notice the loss of airspeed and intervene before loss of control. The first one was Spirit Airlines Flight 970. The two pressure sensors, located on the engine nose bullets, were blocked by ice crystals, leading to incorrect indications and over-estimation of the EPR. The crew noticed the drop in speed and the precursor indications of a stall just before disengagement of the autopilot and putting the aeroplane into a descent. They had not activated the engine anti-ice systems. The second one involved was an MD-83 operated by Swiftair that occurred in June 2014. The crew was aware of the drop of their airspeed and successfully recovered.

Logbook analysis
French BEA revealed that there were several technical defects on the plane, several of which were on the EPR system. On 21 July 2013, BEA noted that there was intermittent failures on the autothrottle that led to the replacement of the EPR transmitter on No.2 engine. On 19 October 2013, the No.1 engine EPR indicator was faulty (no display of values) and the display was replaced. On 2 March 2014, the autothrottle actuator was replaced. During the recommissioning process, the "EPR LH" failure message was displayed. The left-hand EPR transmitter was therefore also replaced. Due to this, No.1 engine was replaced.

Sequence of events based on FDR analysis
The following was the sequence of events based on the FDR analysis:
The crew had been prepared to fly to Algiers from Ouagadougou. As the crew would fly to Algiers, they should know the weather condition in the area. The crew had arrived in Ouagadougou one hour earlier, and knew about the weather in the region. Therefore, they had already known the risks of turbulence and icing while flying in the region. After handling the ground clearance, AH5017 finally took off from Ouagadougou at 01:15 local time (same time as UTC). There were no incidents in its initial climb.

13 minutes after takeoff, while climbing through flight level 215 (AH5017 slightly deviated to the left to avoid a storm in the area. They reported this to Ouagadougou ACC. However, even though they knew that a storm had occurred in the area, the flight crews did not activate the engine anti-icing system. At the time, the temperature in the area indicated a high risk of icing. According to the procedures, the engine anti-ice system should have been activated. Even though ice crystals were likely to form due to the temperature and weather in the area, the airframe seemed to be not affected by icing. This was also what happened to the windshield. The probable absence of icing on the airframe (in particular on the windshield wipers), the possible lack of clear signs of ice crystals (which may be difficult to visually detect especially at night, and are usually not detectable on the weather radar), plus the absence of significant turbulence, probably did not encourage the crew to activate the engine anti-icing system.

The plane then levelled off at 01:37 local time. Flight crews then engaged the autopilot and the autothrottle. Two minutes after leveling off, the speed of the plane increased. The crew then selected the cruise thrust regime on the TRP (Thrust Rating Panel). 

Shortly after, the EPR (Engine Pressure Ratio) values of the right engine became incorrect, probably due to the obstruction of the pressure sensor of this engine by ice crystals. The autothrottle then adjusted the thrust to prevent the erroneous values from exceeding the EPR limit in cruise setting. The thrust delivered by the engines was then lower than the thrust required for level flight, and the speed of the plane continued to decrease. For about one minute, the gap between the EPR values of the left and right engines gradually increased and then stabilized between 0.2 and 0.3 and the autothrottle switched to MACH ATL mode three times. 55 seconds after the anomaly of the right engine, the left engine's EPR values also became erroneous and started to increase. Due to these erroneous readings, the crew became aware that an anomaly had occurred on AH5017. Five seconds later, and for four seconds, this increase was interrupted by a decrease in both engines' RPM. This decrease could have resulted from the crew reducing the Mach target, or from manual decrease in engine RPM by over-riding the autothrottle. However, even though there were many anomalies occurred in the engine, the speed of the plane was still near at normal speed cruising, causing the crew to not activate the engine anti-icing system. They did not know that there was an insufficient thrust to the plane's engine due to blockage in the pressure sensors. The engine RPM then increased again until the erroneous left EPR values reached EPR limit. The thrust delivered by the engines remained lower than the thrust required in this phase of flight and the plane continued to decelerate. The gap between the right EPR and the left EPR became closer with the typical EPR values while in cruise. The N1 values were slightly lower than the typical cruise values (77% instead of 80 – 85%). The inconsistency between the EPR values and N1 values was therefore hardly noticeable by the crew, more so since documentation they had did not have a table of correct actions between EPR and N1 and they had not been trained to observe the correct action between these two parameters. Additionally, the crews were still busy to avoid a storm system nearby and trying to contact Niamey.

AH5017's speed then decreased further until , nearly at its stall speed. The Mach indicator needle was close to vertical, such reading should have been noticed by the flight crews and they should have put the plane into a descent. However, they only made an input on the thrust lever. This was the correct action when there was a problem with the EPR system. However, this action alone does not correspond to the reaction expected of a crew in an approach to stall. They should have put the aircraft into a descent. They did notice that there was a problem in AH5017's EPR. The "SPEED LOW" warning then appeared on the cockpit screen. However, because the flight crews were handling the contact with Niamey ACC, they reacted slowly with the warning. At this point, the autopilot was still engaged.

When the speed reached , the stick shaker triggered, followed three seconds later by the triggering of the stall warning. From this time onwards, Captain Mogio's side loudspeaker only broadcast the "STALL" warning, while that on First Officer Caimari's side alternated the "STALL" warning with the other warnings that were active. When a stall happens, the crew should disconnect the autopilot and execute the stall recovery procedure. Neither actions were done by the crew, indicating that they did not know that a stall had happened in-flight. In order to maintain altitude, the autopilot then commanded a continuous nose-up movement of the trimmable horizontal stabilizer and the elevators. This resulted in an increase in the angle of attack of up to 24°, or 13° above the stall angle of attack in the event conditions, as well as the broadcast of several "STABILIZER MOTION" warnings. Both engines suffered a surge probably due to the plane's high angle of attack. Both engines RPM then decreased to values close to idle. This surge may have been noticed by the crew. There was no sign of a reaction by the crew other than the throttle movements, until the disconnection of the autopilot which occurred 25 seconds after the triggering of the stick shaker. The plane was banking to the left and its pitch decreasing. The crew applied input mainly to roll to the right to bring the wings level. At the same time, they applied mainly nose up inputs, contrary to the inputs required to recover the stall and continued to do so until Flight 5017 touched the ground.

Conclusion
On 22 April 2016, the BEA finally concluded the cause of the crash as follows: 
"The aeroplane speed, piloted by the autothrottle, decreased due to the obstruction of the pressure sensors located on the engine nose cones, probably caused by ice crystals. The autopilot then gradually increased the angle of attack to maintain altitude until the aeroplane stalled. The stall was not recovered. The aeroplane retained a pitch-down attitude and left bank angle down to the ground, while the control surfaces remained mainly deflected pitch up and in the direction of a bank to the right. The aeroplane hit the ground at high speed."

Contributing factors:
 the non-activation of the engine anti-icing systems
 the obstruction of the Pt2 pressure sensors, probably by ice crystals, generating erroneous EPR values that caused the autothrottle to limit the thrust produced by the engines to a level below that required to maintain the aeroplane at FL310.
 the crew's late reaction to the decrease in speed and to the erroneous EPR values, possibly linked to the work load associated with avoiding the convective zone and communication difficulties with air traffic control.
 the crew's lack of reaction to the appearance of buffet, the stickshaker and the stall warning.
 the lack of appropriate inputs on the flight controls to recover from a stall situation.
 The FCOM procedure relating to the activation of the anti-icing systems that was not adapted to Pt2 pressure sensor obstruction by ice crystals
 Insufficient information for operators on the consequences of a blockage of the Pt2 pressure sensor by icing
 The stickshaker and the stall warning triggering logic that led these devices to be triggered belatedly in relation to the aeroplane stall in cruise;
 the autopilot logic that enables it to continue to give pitch-up commands beyond the stall angle, thereby aggravating the stall situation and increasing the crew's difficulties in recovery.

The BEA issued more than 20 recommendations in response to the crash, several of them noted on past aviation accidents, including West Caribbean Airways Flight 708, Air France Flight 447, and a serious incident onboard Spirit Airlines Flight 970. Some of the recommendations were based on Search and Rescue operations, CVR malfunctions, and an "urgent" recommendation to the FAA about icing on aircraft.

Legal actions
Prosecutors in Paris opened a preliminary "involuntary homicide" investigation. Several inquiries had been launched in France, Burkina Faso, Spain, Montreal and San Francisco. Relatives of Canadian victims filed a lawsuit, at the Montreal Courthouse,  to Air Algérie in response to the crash. The lawsuit alleges that Swiftair pilots intentionally chose a flight path that passed through the eye of a tropical storm. It also alleges the pilots failed to perform necessary measures to try to fly the plane to safety, including activating the plane's de-icing mechanisms. Victims' relatives were claiming moral, psychological and traumatic damages, as well as financial loss and the "loss of a loved one".

French newspaper Le Figaro cited a judicial probe that the crash of Flight 5017 was caused due to a series of errors, caused by the failure of the de-icing equipment on the plane. Based on the probe, the failure led to sensors on the engines becoming clogged with ice and reporting back false data to the pilots. As such, when the engine began to lose thrust, the pilots were unaware of it. The situation would have been compounded when the pilot attempted to regain altitude by pulling back on the joystick, indicating pilot error. The flight simulator system used to train the crew was not exactly the same as the actual plane, the MD-83. The pilots did not have any experience at flying in Africa's meteorological conditions. In the latter, it stated that both pilots had only one African flight experience. The crew also had outdated information on the weather conditions on the route they were flying, having received their last update 2½ hours before takeoff, while the plane's crews had trouble communicating with ground staff.

See also

Agence Nationale de l'Aviation Civile du Mali
Atmospheric icing
Ice protection system
List of accidents and incidents involving commercial aircraft
List of aircraft accidents and incidents resulting in at least 50 fatalities

Similar incidents
2000 Marsa Brega Shorts 360 crash
Air Florida Flight 90
Air Ontario Flight 1363
American Eagle Flight 4184
Comair Flight 3272
West Caribbean Airways Flight 708
USAir Flight 405
Air France Flight 447

Notes

References

External links

 Republic of Mali Commission of Inquiry
Final Report (Archive)
"Interim Report Accident on 24 July 2014 in the region of Gossi in Mali to the MD-83 registered EC-LTV operated by Swiftair S.A." (Archive)
"Description of engine thrust control" (Archive)
"Information on the accident that occurred in the region of Gossi (Mali) on 24 July 2014 to the McDonnell Douglas DC-9-83 (MD 83), registered EC-LTV, operated by Swiftair SA as flight AH 5017" (Archive)
"Safety recommendations issued to the FAA and the EASA on 10 July, 2015 by the President of the Mali Commission of Inquiry and the BEA" (Archive)
Bureau of Enquiry and Analysis for Civil Aviation Safety
"Accident to the McDonnell Douglas MD-83, registered EC-LTV, on 24 July 2014 in the region of Gao (Mali)"
"Accident survenu dans la région de Gossi (Mali) le 24 juillet 2014 à l'avion McDonnell Douglas DC-9-83 (MD-83), immatriculé EC-LTV , exploité par Swiftair SA, vol AH 5017." 
Información Incidente Aéreo / Aviation Incident Information (Archive). Swiftair. 
"Condoléances" (Archive). Air Algérie. 

2014 in Algeria
2014 in Burkina Faso
2014 in Mali
Accidents and incidents involving the McDonnell Douglas MD-83
Air Algérie accidents and incidents
Airliner accidents and incidents caused by ice
Aviation accidents and incidents in 2014
Aviation accidents and incidents in Mali
July 2014 events in Africa
Mopti Region